Sir Richard Osborne, 1st Baronet, MP (1593 - 1666/67) was an Irish baronet, lawyer and politician.

Biography
Osborne served as Clerk of the King's Court of Ireland between 1616 and 1629 before being created a baronet in the Baronetage of Ireland of Ballintaylor and Ballylemon, County Waterford, on 15 October 1629.

Sir Richard sat as a Member of Parliament for Waterford County being returned to the Irish House of Commons between 1639 and 1649, and between 1661 and 1666.

Marriage and issue
Osborne and his wife Mary, daughter of Roger Dalton, of Knockmahon, Co. Waterford, had the following surviving sons: 
 Sir Richard Osborne, 2nd Baronet (1618 - 2 March 1685)
 Nicholas Osborne, of Cappagh, County Tyrone (1620 - 1695), Clerk of the Crown of Ireland, married Anne Parsons, and had two sons and one daughter: 
Sir Thomas Osborne, 5th Baronet (c. 1639 - 10 October 1715)
 Grace Osborne, married firstly in 1656 John Stoute, of Youghal, County Cork, without issue, married secondly Piers Power, of Knockanore, Co. Waterford, without issue, and married thirdly Philip Fitzjames Ronayne, of Ronayne's Court, Co. Cork and had female issue
 John Osborne (c. 1622 - 1667), educated at Trinity College, Dublin
 Roger Osborne (c. 1623 - 17 February 1679), educated at TCD, married Mabel, Lady Tynte (née Smyth)

Coat of arms

Sources
 Charles Mosley, editor, Burke's Peerage, Baronetage & Knightage, 107th edition, 3 volumes (Wilmington, Delaware, U.S.A.: Burke's Peerage (Genealogical Books) Ltd, 2003), volume 2, pages 3030 and 3031.
 Hugh Montgomery-Massingberd, editor, Burke's Irish Family Records (London, U.K.: Burkes Peerage Ltd, 1976), page 429.

References

External links
 www.thepeerage.com

1593 births
People from County Waterford
Irish MPs 1639–1649
Irish MPs 1661–1666
1667 deaths
Osborne baronets
Members of the Parliament of Ireland (pre-1801) for County Waterford constituencies